A Moment in Life That's Right is the first studio album by Echo Orbiter.  It was released on Looking Glass Workshop in 1998.  "Combining Revolver-era Beatles studio trickery with Syd Barrett-styled songwriting," A Moment in Life That's Right was described as an album of crafty and catchy harmonies, "a new twist to new pop, and a lovely racket indeed."  The band has described the album as "designedly autotelic".

Track listing

Credits
Justin Emerle - guitar, vocals, percussion, keyboards
Colin Emerle - bass guitar, vocals, percussion, keyboards
Jeremiah Steffan - drums, vocals, percussion
Michael Dooling - additional keyboards on tracks 1, 3, 6, 11

References

External links
A Moment In Life That's Right

1998 debut albums
Echo Orbiter albums